Virupaksha Raya II (1465–1485) was a king of the Vijayanagara Empire from the Sangama Dynasty.

In 1465, Virupaksha Raya II succeeded his uncle, Mallikarjuna Raya, a corrupt and weak ruler who continually lost against the empire's enemies. Even so, Virupaksha Raya II was no more of a better ruler than his predecessor. Throughout his reign, Virupaksha was faced with rebellious nobles and officers as well as multiple enemies who began to invade the weakened kingdom. It was during this time that Virupaksha Raya II lost the Konkan coast (including Goa, Chaul, and Dabul) by 1470 to Prime Minister Mahamud Gawan from the Bahamani kingdom, who was sent to conquer the area by the Sultan Muhammad Shah III. The Bahmani Sultan would also invade Doab of Krishna and Tungabhadra, and the Raja Purushottama Gajapati of Odisha invaded Tiruvannamalai. Because of these losses, Virupaksha became increasingly unpopular and ignited many of the empire's provinces to rebel, eventually leading up to Virupaksha's death in the hands of his own son, Praudharaya in 1485. Praudharaya himself was not able to salvage the kingdom but an able general Saluva Narasimha took control of the empire in 1485 and helped to prevent its demise, though this change of power marked the end of the Sangama Dynasty and the beginning of the Saluva Dynasty.

References

 Dr. Suryanath U. Kamat, Concise history of Karnataka, MCC, Bangalore, 2001 (Reprinted 2002)

External links
APonline Article
Ourkarnataka Article
Sangama Article

1485 deaths
15th-century Indian monarchs
1465 births
Indian Hindus
Hindu monarchs
Sangama dynasty
People of the Vijayanagara Empire